Shaman is the nineteenth studio album by Santana. Shaman was released on October 22, 2002, and debuted at number 1 on the Billboard 200 with first week sales of 298,973. It was certified Double Platinum by the RIAA and Gold in Greece.

The first single of the album was "The Game of Love", featuring Michelle Branch. "Why Don't You & I", featuring Chad Kroeger of Nickelback, was also re-recorded as a single in 2003, which featured Alex Band of The Calling.

Like the previous album, Supernatural, Shaman features various famous rock, hip hop, and pop artists, as well as Spanish opera star, Plácido Domingo.

The album is Santana's longest studio release to date.

Singles
The first single released, "The Game of Love" which features Michelle Branch, peaked at number 5 on the U.S. Billboard Hot 100, number 16 in the UK, and number 21 in Australia. A re-recorded version of "Why Don't You & I" with vocals by Alex Band peaked at number 8 on the U.S. Billboard Hot 100. "Feels Like Fire" (featuring Dido) and "Nothing at All" (featuring Musiq) failed to chart in most countries.

Track listing

The International Version (outside the U.S.) drops the track "Since Supernatural", and includes the song "Let Me Love You Tonight" as the twelfth track.

Personnel
 "Adouma"
Guitar – Carlos Santana
Keyboards – Chester D Thompson
Bass – Benny Rietveld
Drums – Billy Johnson
Percussion – Karl Perazzo
Congas – Raul Rekow
Vocals – Tony Lindsay, Carlos Santana, Karl Perazzo
Trombone – Jose Abel Figueroa, Mic Gillette
Trumpet – Mic Gillette, Marvin McFadden 
 "Nothing at All"
Guitar – Carlos Santana
Lead Vocal – Musiq
Keyboards – George Whitty
Bass – Benny Rietveld
Drums – Carter Beauford
Congas & Percussion – Karl Perazzo
"The Game of Love"
Lead Guitar – Carlos Santana
Rhythm Guitar & Lead Vocal – Michelle Branch
Electric Guitar – Rusty Anderson
Keyboards – Chester D Thompson
Programming – Dante Ross, John Gamble
Bass – Benny Rietveld
Congas & Percussion – Carlos Santana
"You Are My Kind"
Guitar – Carlos Santana
Lead Vocal – Seal
Keyboards – Chester D Thompson
Bass – Benny Rietveld
Drums – Horacio Hernandez
Percussion – Karl Perazzo
Congas – Raul Rekow
Vamp Out Vocal – Karl Perazzo
Background Vocals – Karl Perazzo, Carlos Santana, Tony Lindsay
"Amoré (Sexo)"
Lead Guitar – Carlos Santana
Lead Vocal – Macy Gray
Keyboards – Chester D Thompson
Bass – Benny Rietveld
Drums – Rodney Holmes
Percussion – Karl Perazzo
Congas – Raul Rekow
Trombone – Jeff Cressman, Jose Abel Figueroa
Trumpet – Javier Melendez, William Ortiz
"Foo Foo"
Lead Guitar – Carlos Santana
Rhythm Guitar – Francis Dunnery, Al Anderson
Keyboards – Loris Holland
Programming – Kobie Brown, Che Pope
Bass – Tom Barney
Background Vocals – Lenesha Randolph
Saxophone & Flute – Danny Wolinski
Trombone – Steve Touré
Trumpet & Flugelhorn – Earl Gardner
Tuba – Joseph Daley
"Victory Is Won"
Guitar – Carlos Santana
Cello – Joseph Herbert
Viola – Daniel Seidenberg, Hari Balakrisnan
Violin – Jeremy Cohen
"Since Supernatural"
Guitar & Sleigh Bells – Carlos Santana
Lead Vocals – Melky Jean and Governor Washington, Jr.
Keyboards – Chester D Thompson
Programming & Accordion – K. C. Porter
Bass – Benny Rietveld
Drums – Rodney Holmes
Percussion – Karl Perazzo
Congas – Raul Rekow
Vocals – Tony Lindsay, K. C. Porter, Karl Perazzo
Trombone – Ramon Flores, Mic Gillette
Trumpet – Jose Abel Figueroa, Marvin McFadden, Mic Gillette
"America"
Lead Guitar – Carlos Santana
Lead Vocal – P.O.D.
Rhythm Guitar – Sergio Vallín
Keyboards – Alberto Salas, Chester D Thompson
Bass – Juan Calleros
Drums – Alex González
Timbales & Percussion – Karl Perazzo
Congas – Raul Rekow
Background Vocals – Gonzalo Chomat, Alex González
Vocal Direction – Jose Quintana
"Sideways"
Lead & Rhythm Guitar – Carlos Santana
Lead Vocal – Citizen Cope
Background Vocals – Chad & Earl
Keyboards – Chester D Thompson
Bass – Benny Rietveld
Drums – Rodney Holmes
Timbales & Percussion – Karl Perazzo
Congas & Percussion – Raul Rekow
Additional Percussion – Humberto Hernandez
"Why Don't You & I"
Lead Guitar – Carlos Santana
Lead Vocal - Chad Kroeger
Rhythm Guitar & Percussion – Raul Pacheco
Keyboards & Programming – K. C. Porter, Chester D Thompson
Bass [Chorus Bass] – Leland Sklar
Drums – Gregg Bissonette
Timbales – Karl Perazzo
Congas – Raul Rekow
"Feels Like Fire"
Lead Guitar – Carlos Santana
Lead Vocal - Dido
Rhythm Guitar – J. B. Eckl
Keyboards – K C Porter, Chester D Thompson
Programming – K C Porter
Bass – Mike Porcaro
Drums – Jimmy Keegan
Timbales & Percussion – Karl Perazzo
Congas & Percussion – Luis Conte
Lead Vocal – K. C. Porter
Background Vocals – Fher, Carlos Santana, Tony Lindsay, Karl Perazzo, K. C. Porter
Spanish Translation – Chein Garcia Alonso
"Aye Aye Aye"
Lead Guitar – Carlos Santana
Keyboards – Chester D Thompson
Percussion – Carlos Santana
Programming – Mike Mani
Vocals – Tony Lindsay, Jeanie Tracy
Pro Tools Editing – Andre for Screaming Lizard
"Hoy Es Adios"
Lead Guitar - Carlos Santana
Lead Vocal - Alejandro Lerner

Charts

Weekly charts

Year-end charts

Sales and certifications

Personnel
Carlos Santana - vocals, acoustic 12-string, nylon string & electric guitars, keyboards, timbales, rainstick 
Michael Shrieve - drums
Dennis Chambers - drums
Karl Perazzo - timbales, congas, percussion 
Raul Rékow - congas, percussion 
Chester D Thompson - keyboards 
Benny Rietveld - bass guitar 
Tony Lindsay - lead vocals, vocals 
Andy Vargas -  lead vocals, vocals 
John Ginty - organ, keyboards 
Pauline Taylor - background vocals 
Bill Ortiz - trumpet 
Arturo Velasco - trombone

References 

 Shaman in CD Universe

External links 
 

Santana (band) albums
2002 albums
Arista Records albums
Albums produced by Carlos Santana
Albums produced by Clive Davis
Albums produced by Cory Rooney